Thomas Hay, 7th Earl of Kinnoull (1660 – 5 January 1719), styled as Viscount Dupplin from 1697–1709, was a Scottish peer and  Conservative politician.

Biography

He was a descendant of Peter Hay of Rattray, Perthshire (younger brother of George Hay, 1st Earl of Kinnoull) and Margaret Boyd.   Thomas Hay was a Tory member of the Scottish parliament for Perthshire between 1693 and 1697. He was created Viscount Dupplin on 31 December 1697. He resided at the family seat of Balhousie Castle.

William Hay, 6th Earl of Kinnoull, a supporter of King James II and VII, resigned his titles after the king's abdication. William was given a life peerage by Queen Anne and upon his death on 10 May 1709, the titles passed to Thomas.

He was a commissioner for the Union of English and Scottish Parliaments in 1707. He sat in the First Parliament of Great Britain as one of 16 representative peers between 1710 and 1714.

The earl and his heir were briefly imprisoned in Edinburgh Castle on suspicion of Jacobite sympathies during the 1715 uprising.

Marriage and issue

He married Lady Elizabeth, daughter of William Drummond, 1st Viscount Strathallan, on 20 December 1683. They had five children:

 Lady Margaret Hay (30 September 1686 – 26 April 1707), married John Erskine, 6th Earl of Mar on 6 April 1703
 Lady Elizabeth Hay (d. 1723), married James Ogilvy, 5th Earl of Findlater 
 George Henry Hay  (23 June 1689 – 28 July 1758), married Lady Abigail Harley
 William Hay, died before 1711 
 John Hay of Cromlix (1691–1740) created the Earl of Inverness

References

1660 births
1719 deaths
07
Scottish representative peers
Peers of Scotland created by William II
Shire Commissioners to the Parliament of Scotland
Members of the Parliament of Scotland 1689–1702